Frank Stephenson is an American automobile designer.

Frank or Francis Stephenson may also refer to:

Frank Stephenson (saloon keeper) (fl.1860–1885), American saloon keeper
Frank Stephenson (footballer) (born 1934), Australian rules footballer
Frank Stephenson (ice hockey), American ice hockey goaltender
Francis Stephenson (born 1976), English rugby league player

See also
Frank Stevenson (disambiguation)
Francis Seymour Stevenson (1862–1938), British Liberal Party politician, author and scholar